The 2013 World Draughts Championship match  at the international draughts was held May 12–18, 2013 in Tallinn, Estonia International Draughts Federation FMJD between the actual World Champion Alexander Georgiev (Russia) and the challenger Alexander Schwartzman (Russia). Alexander Georgiev won and became the world champion for the seven time.

Rules and regulations
The match consists of seven micro-matches. Each micro-match is played till the first victory. First game of micro-match — standard game 1 hour 20 min + 1 min per move, if draw at 1st game — rapid game 20 min + 5 sec per move. If draw at rapid game — blitz game 5 min + 3 sec per move.

If draw at blitz game — Lehmann-Georgiev tie break 5 min + 2 sec per move on all games till the first victory.

The final result of the match was determined by the result games with normal time control, if draw was determined by the result rapid games, if draw was determined by the result blitz games.

Results

See also
List of Draughts World Championship winners

External links
Site 2013 World Draughts Championship match 

2013 in draughts
Draughts world championships
Sports competitions in Tallinn
2013 in Estonian sport
International sports competitions hosted by Estonia
May 2013 sports events in Europe
21st century in Tallinn